Spring Valley Township is an inactive township in Shannon County, in the U.S. state of Missouri.

Spring Valley Township was erected in 1842, and named for a valley containing springs within its borders.

References

Townships in Missouri
Townships in Shannon County, Missouri